Selivanov is a Russian masculine surname, its feminine counterpart is Selivanova. It may refer to:

Alexander Selivanov (born 1971), Russian ice hockey player
Alexey Selivanov (1900–1949), Soviet general
Andrey Selivanov (1847–1917), Russian politician 
Dmitry Selivanov (1964–1989), Russian rock singer
Dmitry Fyodorovich Selivanov (1855–1932), Russian mathematician
Nina Selivanova (1886–1953), Russian-American author, lecturer and translator
Pāvels Seļivanovs (born 1952), Latvian volleyball player
Volodymyr Selivanov (born 1945), Ukrainian jurist, researcher and statesman

Russian-language surnames